The qualification for the UEFA Women's Euro 1997 was held between September 17, 1995 & September 29, 1996. The first-placed of the group stage qualified directly. The second-placed and the third-placed teams played in two playoff matches for four other berths.

CLASS A

Group 1

Norway qualified for the final tournament.

Germany and Finland advanced for the playoff A.

Slovakia advanced for the playoff A-B.

Group 2

Russia qualified for the final tournament.

France and Iceland advanced for the playoff A.

Netherlands advanced for the playoff A-B.

Group 3

Italy qualified for the final tournament.

England and Portugal advanced for the playoff A.

Croatia advanced for the playoff A-B.

Group 4

Sweden qualified for the final tournament.

Denmark and Spain advanced for the playoff A.

Romania advanced for the playoff A-B.

CLASS B

Group 5

Belgium advanced for the playoff A-B.

Group 6

Czech Republic advanced for the playoff A-B.

Group 7

Switzerland advanced for the playoff A-B.

Group 8

Ukraine advanced for the playoff A-B.

PLAYOFF A

First leg

Second leg

France won 5–0 on aggregate.

Denmark won 12–1 on aggregate.

Germany won 7–0 on aggregate.

Spain won 3–2 on aggregate.

France, Denmark, Germany and Spain qualified for the final tournament.

PLAYOFF A-B

First leg

Second leg

Belgium won 5–2 on aggregate.

Netherlands won 3–1 on aggregate.

Switzerland won 6–2 on aggregate.

Ukraine won 5–3 on aggregate.

External links
1995–97 UEFA Women's EURO at UEFA.com
Tables & results at RSSSF.com

qualification
UEFA Women's Championship qualification
UEFA
UEFA